Mojibur Rahman (13 October 1941–30 January 2016) was a Jatiya Party (Ershad) politician and the former Member of Parliament of Lalmonirhat-2. He had served 7 consecutive terms.

Career
Rahman was elected Member of Parliament from Lalmonirhat-2 constituency on the nomination of Jatiya Party in the 3rd Jatiya Sangsad of 1986, 4th of 1988, 5th of 1991, 7th of 12 June 1996, 8th of 2001 and 9th of 2008.

Rahman was elected to parliament from Rangpur-6 as a Bangladesh Nationalist Party candidate in 1979.

References

2016 deaths
Jatiya Party politicians
3rd Jatiya Sangsad members
4th Jatiya Sangsad members
5th Jatiya Sangsad members
6th Jatiya Sangsad members
7th Jatiya Sangsad members
8th Jatiya Sangsad members
9th Jatiya Sangsad members
2nd Jatiya Sangsad members
1941 births